Carl "Pinky" Jorgensen (November 21, 1914 – May 2, 1996) was an outfielder in Major League Baseball. He played for the Cincinnati Reds.

References

External links

1914 births
1996 deaths
Major League Baseball outfielders
Cincinnati Reds players
Baseball players from California
Saint Mary's Gaels baseball players